The second season of The Great Canadian Baking Show premiered on CBC Television on September 19, 2018. Ten amateur bakers competed over eight weeks of challenges throughout the competition for the title. Canadian actor and television personality Dan Levy and Canadian-British actress Julia Chan returned as hosts, with French-born Canadian chef Bruno Feldeisen and Canadian-Australian pastry chef Rochelle Adonis also returning as judges. For the second season, producer Marike Emery stated that the audition process prioritized "skill over personality" and that the tasks would be more challenging than the first season.

After eight weeks of competition, Andrei Godoroja was crowned the winner with Sachin Seth and Megan Stasiewich as runners-up.

This was also the last season for hosts Dan Levy and Julia Chan, as well as judge Rochelle Adonis.

Bakers

Results summary

Episodes

Episode 1: Cake 
The inaugural Signature Challenge had the bakers make an upside-down fruit cake with any ingredients of their choosing to put "on top," with two hours to create it. The Technical Challenge involved the bakers creating an orange chiffon cake - along with an orange glaze and candied orange toppings - in two hours. The Showstopper Challenge featured the bakers creating a birthday cake - with at least three layers and two different flavours - for anyone of their choosing, all within four hours.

Episode 2: Biscuits and Bars 
For the Signature challenge, the bakers had to make 24 dessert bars with at least 3 distinct layers in two hours. For the Technical Challenge, bakers had to make 18 digestive biscuits topped with tempered chocolate in 1 hour 30 minutes. In the Showstopper Challenge, the bakers had 4 and a half hours to bake 36 identical cookies to be placed inside an edible and elaborate biscuit box.

Episode 3: Bread 
For the Signature Challenge, the bakers had to produce two loaves (or 12 pieces) of a quick bread (a bread which does not use yeast) along with a homemade spread in one and a half hours. The Technical Challenge required to the bakers to create 20 uniform hot cross buns, including an apricot glaze, in two and a half hours. In the Showstopper Challenge, bakers had four and a half hours to create a sandwich cake, including decorations and a proper balance of bread and filling.

Episode 4: International 
For the Signature challenge, the bakers were given 2 hours to craft 24 hand pies. They could fashion and flavour the hand pies any way they wished, but they also had to accompany the pies with a complementary dipping sauce. In the Technical challenge, the bakers had 2 hours to craft 12 daifuku mochi, a traditional Japanese dessert consisting a glutinous rice cake stuffed with a strawberry encased in a sweetened red bean paste. For the Showstopper challenge, bakers had four hours to create a sculpture or diorama of at least two types of Italian cookies.

Episode 5: Pastry 
For the Signature Challenge, the bakers were asked to make a fruit-filled slab pie: a shallow pie that is rectangular rather than round, baked in a rimmed baking sheet pan or jelly roll pan, in two hours and 15 minutes. The Technical Challenge gave them two hours and 15 minutes to create two dozen palmiers, 12 sweet and 12 savoury, using rough puff pastry. For the Showstopper Challenge, bakers had four and a half hours to produce a basket of 18 breakfast pastries—six croissants, six Danish, and six sweet buns.

Episode 6: Chocolate 
In the quarterfinal Signature Challenge, the bakers were given two hours to create a tart with tempered chocolate decorations. The tart itself could be any shape or flavour as long as chocolate was the "star" ingredient. The uniquely time-sensitive nature of the Technical Challenge, one hour and 45 minutes to bake a chocolate soufflé, required that the bakers' starting times be staggered (in order - Mengling, Sachin, Timothy, Megan, Andrei) and the judges taste each soufflé fresh from the oven. Finally, the Showstopper Challenge required the bakers to create a modern re-imagining of the Black Forest cake.

Episode 7: French Pâtisserie 

The Pâtisserie Signature Challenge had the bakers make a mille crêpes cake: a cake built of at least 25 layered crêpes with a sweet filling between the layers, in two hours. For the Technical Challenge, they had two hours, 15 minutes to make 12 miniature jocondes, a cake of layered and filled almond sponge and mousse. The Showstopper gave them four hours to produce 36 savoury canapés: 12 with puff pastry, 12 tartlets, and 12 finger sandwiches.

Episode 8: Finale 
For the Signature challenge the finalists had two and a half hours to make 24 mini Swiss rolls, in two flavours. The Technical Challenge was to produce a Swedish Princess cake in two hours and 15 minutes. For the final showstopper, the bakers had to prepare a Choux pastry tower with at least three layers, and a minimum of two shapes of choux and three flavours of fillings, in four and a half hours; it was the hottest day of filming, handicapping the bakers in assembling their chocolate and cream towers.

References 

2
2018 Canadian television seasons